For Century Ultimate Zest is the 3rd Korean mini-album released by the South Korean boy band F.Cuz. The album was released in physical and digital format on April 27, 2012. For Century Ultimate Zest is the first album with their new 5 member line up after former member Lee-U's withdrawal.

Track listing

Chart performance

Singles

Sales

References

 http://www.yesasia.com/us/f-cuz-mini-album-vol-3-for-century-ultimate-zest/1030819229-0-0-0-en/info.html yesasia. Retrieved 2012-04-30

External links
 Official website 

2012 EPs
KMP Holdings EPs
F.Cuz albums
Korean-language EPs